James A. Pulliam (October 12, 1863 – September 17, 1934) was the 19th Lieutenant Governor of Colorado, serving from 1917 to 1919 under Julius Caldeen Gunter. He was born in Scotland County, Missouri and died in Durango, Colorado. Pulliam was a Democrat.

References

Lieutenant Governors of Colorado
1863 births
1934 deaths